Ernest Myers is the name of:

Ernest Myers (author)
Ernest Myers (footballer)